MV Empire MacRae was a grain ship converted to become a Merchant Aircraft Carrier or MAC ship during the Second World War.

She was built at Lithgows shipyard in Glasgow, Scotland, under order from the Ministry of War Transport. As a MAC ship, only her air crew and the necessary maintenance staff were naval personnel and she was operated by Hain Steam Ship Co Ltd of St Ives.

After the war, the ship was converted to a grain carrier and was eventually scrapped at Kaohsiung in 1971.

See also 
 List of aircraft carriers

External links
 FAA archive Empire MacRae -

References

World War II aircraft carriers of the United Kingdom
Bulk carriers
Grain ships
Empire MacRae
Empire ships
1943 ships